Hasanabad-e Gorji (also Romanized as Ḩasanābād-e Gorjī; also known as Ḩasanābād-e Shāhrāh) is a village in Miyan Velayat Rural District, in the Central District of Mashhad County, Razavi Khorasan Province, Iran. At the 2006 census, its population was 181, in 43 families.

References 

Populated places in Mashhad County